The Carmel Market bombing was a suicide bombing which occurred on 1 November 2004 at the Carmel Market located at the heart of Tel Aviv's business district. Three people were killed in the attack and over 30 people were injured.

The Popular Front for the Liberation of Palestine claimed responsibility for the attack.

The attack
On Monday, 1 November 2004, shortly after 11:00 am, a Palestinian suicide bomber wearing an explosive belt hidden underneath his clothes detonated the explosive device at the Carmel Market located at the heart of Tel Aviv's business district.

The blast killed three civilians and injured over 30 people.

The perpetrators 
The Palestinian Marxist–Leninist militant group Popular Front for the Liberation of Palestine claimed responsibility for the attack, and stated that the attack was carried out by a 16-year-old Palestinian named Amar Alfar who originated from the Palestinian city of Nablus in the West Bank.

Official reactions
Involved parties
: Israeli Foreign Ministry spokesman urged the Palestinian Authority to crack down on armed militants.

:
 Palestinian National Authority - Palestinian leader Yasser Arafat condemned the attack and called on both Palestinians and Israelis to avoid killing civilians.
 Palestinian Prime Minister Ahmed Qurei called for an end to the Palestinian suicide bombings.

References

External links
 Suicide bombing at Carmel Market 1-Nov-2004 - published at the Israeli Ministry of Foreign Affairs
 Three dead in Tel Aviv blast - published on The Guardian on 1 November 2004
 Bomber attacks Tel Aviv market - published on BBC News on 1 November 2004
 Suicide Bomber Strikes Market in Israel, Killing at Least 3 - published on The New York Times on 1 November 2004
 Explosion rocks Tel Aviv market - published on USA Today on 1 November 2004

2004 murders in Israel
Suicide bombing in the Israeli–Palestinian conflict
Terrorist attacks attributed to Palestinian militant groups
Terrorist incidents in Israel in 2004
Terrorist incidents in Tel Aviv
2000s crimes in Tel Aviv
Marketplace attacks in Asia
November 2004 events in Asia
Building bombings in Israel